Ting (also Romanized as Tīng; also known as Tīnk and Tīnk-e Bālā) is a village in Negur Rural District, Dashtiari District, Chabahar County, Sistan and Baluchestan Province, Iran. At the 2006 census, its population was 97, in 31 families.

References 

Populated places in Chabahar County